This article describes the history of West Indies cricket from 1981 to 1990. 

During this decade, the West Indies cricket team dominated Test cricket.  Outstanding players of the time were the captain Viv Richards, opening batsmen Gordon Greenidge and Desmond Haynes, wicketkeeper-batsman Jeff Dujon and a battery of fast bowlers headed by Malcolm Marshall and including Joel Garner, Michael Holding, Curtly Ambrose and Courtney Walsh.  The only "achilles heel" in this outstanding team was the lack of a quality spin bowler.

Domestic cricket 1980–81 to 1990

Shell Shield winners
 1980–81 Combined Islands
 1981–82 Barbados
 1982–83 Guyana
 1983–84 Barbados
 1984–85 Trinidad and Tobago
 1985–86 Barbados
 1986–87 Guyana
 1987–88 Jamaica
 1988–89 Jamaica
 1989–90 Leeward Islands

International tours 1980–81 to 1990

England 1980–81
 [ 1st Test] at Queen's Park Oval, Port of Spain, Trinidad – West Indies won by an innings and 79 runs
 [ 2nd Test] at Bourda, Georgetown – game abandoned
 [ 3rd Test] at Kensington Oval, Bridgetown, Barbados – West Indies won by 298 runs
 [ 4th Test] at Antigua Recreation Ground, St John's – match drawn
 [ 5th Test] at Sabina Park, Kingston – match drawn

India 1982–83
 [ 1st Test] at Sabina Park, Kingston – West Indies won by 4 wickets
 [ 2nd Test] at Queen's Park Oval, Port of Spain, Trinidad – match drawn
 [ 3rd Test] at Bourda, Georgetown – match drawn
 [ 4th Test] at Kensington Oval, Bridgetown, Barbados – West Indies won by 10 wickets
 [ 5th Test] at Antigua Recreation Ground, St John's – match drawn

International XI 1982–83

Australia 1983–84
 [ 1st Test] at Bourda, Georgetown – match drawn
 [ 2nd Test] at Queen's Park Oval, Port of Spain, Trinidad – match drawn
 [ 3rd Test] at Kensington Oval, Bridgetown, Barbados – West Indies won by 10 wickets
 [ 4th Test] at Antigua Recreation Ground, St John's – West Indies won by an innings and 36 runs
 [ 5th Test] at Sabina Park, Kingston – West Indies won by 10 wickets

New Zealand 1984–85
 [ 1st Test] at Queen's Park Oval, Port of Spain, Trinidad – match drawn
 [ 2nd Test] at Bourda, Georgetown – match drawn
 [ 3rd Test] at Kensington Oval, Bridgetown, Barbados – West Indies won by 10 wickets
 [ 4th Test] at Sabina Park, Kingston – West Indies won by 10 wickets

England 1985–86
 [ 1st Test] at Sabina Park, Kingston – West Indies won by 10 wickets
 [ 2nd Test] at Queen's Park Oval, Port of Spain, Trinidad – West Indies won by 7 wickets
 [ 3rd Test] at Kensington Oval, Bridgetown, Barbados – West Indies won by an innings and 30 runs
 [ 4th Test] at Queen's Park Oval, Port of Spain, Trinidad – West Indies won by 10 wickets
 [ 5th Test] at Antigua Recreation Ground, St John's – West Indies won by 240 runs

Pakistan 1987–88
 [ 1st Test] at Bourda, Georgetown – Pakistan won by 9 wickets
 [ 2nd Test] at Queen's Park Oval, Port of Spain, Trinidad – match drawn
 [ 3rd Test] at Kensington Oval, Bridgetown, Barbados – West Indies won by 2 wickets

Canada in Barbados 1987–88

India 1988–89
 [ 1st Test] at Bourda, Georgetown – match drawn
 [ 2nd Test] at Kensington Oval, Bridgetown, Barbados – West Indies won by 8 wickets
 [ 3rd Test] at Queen's Park Oval, Port of Spain, Trinidad – West Indies won by 217 runs
 [ 4th Test] at Sabina Park, Kingston – West Indies won by 7 wickets

England 1989–90
 [ 1st Test] at Sabina Park, Kingston – England won by 9 wickets
 [ 2nd Test] at Bourda, Georgetown – game abandoned
 [ 3rd Test] at Queen's Park Oval, Port of Spain, Trinidad – match drawn
 [ 4th Test] at Kensington Oval, Bridgetown, Barbados – West Indies won by 164 runs
 [ 5th Test] at Antigua Recreation Ground, St John's – West Indies won by an innings and 32 runs

References

External sources
 CricketArchive – itinerary of events

Further reading
 Wisden Cricketers' Almanack

1980–81 to 1990
 1980–81 to 1990